"Alpha" is the sixteenth episode of the sixth season of the science fiction television series The X-Files. It premiered on the Fox network on March 28, 1999, in the United States. The episode was written by Jeffrey Bell, and directed by Peter Markle. The episode is a "Monster-of-the-Week" story, unconnected to the series' wider mythology. "Alpha" earned a Nielsen household rating of 10.1, being watched by 17.7 million people in its initial broadcast. The episode received mostly negative reviews from critics.

The show centers on FBI special agents Fox Mulder (David Duchovny) and Dana Scully (Gillian Anderson) who work on cases linked to the paranormal, called X-Files. Mulder is a believer in the paranormal, while the skeptical Scully has been assigned to debunk his work. In this episode, Mulder and Scully investigate several killings blamed on an Asian dog called the Wanshang Dhole, thought to be extinct. Mulder and Scully join an obstinate Sheriff, a seemingly eccentric hunter, and a reclusive canine expert to find it. However, there is more mystery to the expert than meets the eye.

"Alpha" was based on a single motif—"Scary dogs in the City"—written by Jeffrey Bell onto a notecard. The episode went through several drafts before being readied right before filming began. Several of the scenes featuring the Chinese freighter were created either through digital technology or through the combination of matte paintings and actual filmed footage.

Plot
On a freighter in the South Pacific, two Chinese men inspect a crate with an animal inside. When the ship reaches the Port of Los Angeles, the authorities find the two men dead of vicious bite wounds inside the locked crate and the animal missing. After Fox Mulder (David Duchovny) receives word of the attack from the mysterious Karin Berquist (Melinda Culea), an expert on canine behavior, he and Dana Scully (Gillian Anderson) go to investigate the incident on the ship with the help of San Pedro officer Jeffrey Cahn (Thomas F. Duffy). Meanwhile, in Bellflower, California, a man hears his dog barking in the backyard and lets it in the house. He hears another dog in his backyard and chases it off. After returning to his house he finds his pet dead and is attacked by the other dog, a wolflike creature with glowing red eyes.

Mulder and Scully arrive at the port and talk to the man who imported the dog, Dr. Ian Detweiler (Andrew Robinson), a cryptozoologist. Detweiler says the dog is a Wanshang dhole, a species thought to be extinct. The two agents soon receive news of the other attack and, after investigating, Mulder believes the dhole has near-human intelligence. Mulder and Scully visit Berquist, who tells them that the species they are looking for is extinct. Meanwhile, a dog catcher is chasing a stray through a warehouse when a man enters the building. He promptly transforms into the murderous dhole and attacks the dog catcher. Mulder and Scully arrive at the scene, followed by Berquist, who finds a paw print with five toes.

Later that night, Detweiler arrives at a vet's office to get tranquilizers. The vet goes to the office's kennel area and is attacked by the dhole, but is able to escape and lock the kennel door behind him. The dog catchers arrive and open fire, but the fallen animal turns out to be a Saint Bernard brought there by its owner. While the vet tries to operate on the hurt Saint Bernard, Scully arrives and hears screams coming from the kennels, where she discovers that the vet has been attacked. After Scully leaves, the wounded Saint Bernard on the operating table transforms into the dhole, revealing that it can mimic any shape.

Scully begins to question Berquist's motives, noting that she was the reason Mulder decided to look into this investigation. Mulder, however, begins to suspect Detweiler after learning that he had been at the vet's office; Mulder believes that he is the dhole and is tranquilizing himself in an attempt to stop killing. Mulder asks Cahn to confront Detweiler, but Cahn is attacked and severely injured by the dhole and placed in the hospital. Mulder visits Berquist and says he thinks she has not been honest with him. Berquist reveals that she first suspected Detweiler when she saw him. She also says that he will try to finish off Cahn. Mulder worriedly tells Scully, who remains skeptical.

Later, Berquist hears something in the woods while locking one of the outside kennels at her home. She goes upstairs to retrieve a tranquilizer gun, but when Detweiler, in the guise of the dhole, enters her bedroom to attack her, she sets the gun aside and challenges the dhole. He attacks, causing both of them to fall out of the window behind her. Mulder and Scully arrive and find Detweiler's and Berquist's bodies, the former impaled on a fence spike. Back at the office, Mulder receives a package from Berquist; it is her "I Want to Believe" poster, a replacement for the one he lost in the fire and last seen hanging on her home office wall.

Production

Writing

"Alpha" was written by Jeffrey Bell after seeing a pack of wild dogs. He explained: "Nobody owns [wild] dogs," he noted, "yet these dogs are somehow surviving." Soon thereafter, Bell pitched an idea about "scary dogs in the city" to the writing crew of The X-Files, and it was chosen to go into production. Initially, the story was going to be a "reversal" of 1963 movie The Incredible Journey, featuring "a desperate family [that] moves three thousand miles to get away from their killer pet—who's waiting for them at their new house, really pissed." The story then morphed into one in which a child released his anger through the dogs at a local animal shelter, who functioned as a manifestation of the child's id. Bell scrapped both of these ideas because they lacked "really cool visuals."

After discarding two drafts, Bell approached producer Frank Spotnitz for help. Spotnitz suggested that the main antagonist could be a dog that escapes from a ship and goes on a killing spree. Spotnitz also proposed that Mulder and Berquist develop a quasi-romance before the latter is killed at the end of the episode. Bell began to write the script on January 2, 1999, a mere three weeks before pre-production was scheduled to begin.

Casting and filming
Dozens of trained dogs were auditioned to play the part of the Wanshang Dhole, a process executive producer Michael Watkins later called "a nightmare." Eventually, the producers selected three wolf-Malamute hybrids. Casting director Rick Millikan noted that he auditioned "many, many women" for the part of Karin Berquist. Melinda Culea, the wife of Peter Markle—who happened to direct this episode—was later cast in the role. Although Culea was chosen because she was affiliated with Markle, a majority of the cast and crew "deemed [her] to have done a fine job." Two Cantonese Chinese-speaking immigrant actors were cast to play the parts of Woo and Yee, the sailors who are killed by the Wanshang Dhole in the beginning of the episode.

Due to the fact that the show was operating on a strict budget, shots of the Chinese freighter were almost entirely created using digital technology. For the opening scene a matte painting of a freighterbased on a toy modelwas superimposed over film of an empty stretch of ocean. Several scenes featuring the ship in port were created by filming an empty harbor and then superimposing a ship in post-production. For attack scenes, special effects makeup supervisor John Vulich created a fake latex throat that could be bitten out by the Wanshang Dhole.

Alternate ending
On the season six DVD, an alternate ending to "Alpha" is included. In this version, Mulder receives Berquist's "I Want to Believe" poster and hangs it on his wall. The scene then cuts to Officer Cahn who is recuperating in a hospital bed. When the attending nurse closes the curtains around him, his eyes flash red, insinuating that he now possesses the Wanshang Dhole's morphing abilities.

Reception
"Alpha" first aired in the United States on March 28, 1999. This episode earned a Nielsen rating of 10.1, with a 15 share, meaning that roughly 10.1 percent of all television-equipped households, and 15 percent of households watching television, were tuned in to the episode. It was viewed by 17.7 million viewers. The episode aired in the United Kingdom and Ireland on Sky1 on June 20, 1999, and received 1.02 million viewers, making it the most watched episode that week. Fox promoted the episode with the tagline "Sit. Stay. Kill."

Critical reception to the episode was mostly negative. Zack Handlen of The A.V. Club awarded the episode a "C" and called it a "muddled, tepid bit of television that never really seems to know what story it’s trying to tell". He noted, that while the episode is built around a distinctly "old structure" that harkens back to the show's earlier seasons, the plot becomes predictable quickly. Ultimately, however, he concluded that the episode is compromised by its story which "would’ve been a dud even if it had aired back in 1993". He did, however, compliment the character of Karin Berquist, but wished the episode would have focused more on her and Mulder's relationship. Robert Shearman and Lars Pearson, in their book Wanting to Believe: A Critical Guide to The X-Files, Millennium & The Lone Gunmen, rated the episode one star out of five, and noted that "no matter how good the effects, there's a limit to the number of times a dog with glowing red eyes pouncing on a human can be interesting." The two also were critical of the romantic connection between Mulder and Karin Berquist, calling the sub-plot "an attempt to instill a bit of emotion into this repetitive and formulaic tale [that] fails utterly."

Paula Vitaris from Cinefantastique gave the episode a negative review and awarded it one-and-a-half stars out of four. Vitaris called the episode a "run-of-the-mill monster-of-the-week episode" and noted that David Duchovny and Gillian Anderson had "very little energy". Furthermore, she noted that several of the secondary characters were only in the plot "to be killed, nothing more". Cyriaque Lamar from i09 sarcastically labeled the dhole as "The Were-St. Bernard" and called the episode one of "The 10 Most Ridiculous X-Files Monsters".

Not all reviews were negative, however. Tom Kessenich, in his book Examination: An Unauthorized Look at Seasons 6–9 of the X-Files gave the episode a more positive review, writing "Perhaps I am alone in sensing the off-beat love story I found to be at the heart of 'Alpha'. But it reached out and grabbed me and I found it to be touching, interesting and worthy of analysis."

See also
 List of unmade episodes of The X-Files

Footnotes

Bibliography

External links

 

1999 American television episodes
Canines in popular culture
Chinese mythology in popular culture
Fiction about shapeshifting
Television episodes set in Los Angeles
Television episodes set in Oceania
Television episodes set in China
The X-Files (season 6) episodes
Dhole